{{Automatic taxobox
| fossil_range = Eocene to recent 
| image = Flamingos Laguna Colorada.jpg
| image_caption = James's flamingos (Phoenicopterus jamesi)
| taxon = Phoenicopteriformes
| authority = Fürbringer, 1888
| subdivision_ranks = Subclades
| subdivision = 
Agnopterus?
Juncitarsus?
Kashinia?
Scaniornis?
Palaelodidae
Phoenicopteridae
}}
Phoenicopteriformes  is a group of water birds which comprises flamingos and their extinct relatives. Flamingos (Phoenicopteriformes) and the closely related grebes (Podicipedidae) are contained in the parent clade Mirandornithes.

 Fossil record 
Flamingos and their relatives are well attested in the fossil record, with the first unequivocal member of the Phoenicopteridae, Elornis, known from the late Eocene epoch.

 Relation to extinct palaelodids 
The Palaelodidae – an extinct family of peculiar "swimming flamingos" – are believed to be the closest relatives of the modern flamingos, with the extinct genus Juncitarsus'' slightly more primitive than the clade which contains flamingos and grebes (Mirandornithes).

The foot and wing anatomy of fossil palaelodids suggests that they were surface-swimming birds, rather than grebe-like divers as was proposed in the past. Whether swimmers or divers, that both primitive phoenicopteriforms and their closest relatives, the grebes, were highly aquatic, indicates that the entire clade Mirandornithes evolved from aquatic, probably swimming ancestors.

References 

 
 
Bird orders
Extant Eocene first appearances
Eocene taxonomic orders
Oligocene taxonomic orders
Miocene taxonomic orders
Pliocene taxonomic orders
Pleistocene taxonomic orders
Holocene taxonomic orders
Taxa named by Max Fürbringer